This is a list of members of the 2nd Bundestag – the lower house of parliament of the Federal Republic of Germany, whose members were in office from 1953 until 1957.



Members

A 

 Annemarie Ackermann, CDU
 Konrad Adenauer, CDU
 Johannes Albers, CDU
 Luise Albertz, SPD
 Ernst Albrecht, CDU (from 11 May 1956)
 Lisa Albrecht, SPD
 Jakob Altmaier, SPD
 Josef Arndgen, CDU
 Adolf Arndt, SPD
 Otto Arnholz, SPD
 Karl Atzenroth, FDP

B 

 Fritz Baade, SPD
 Fritz Baier, CDU (from 26 June 1956)
 Hans Bals, SPD
 Wilhelm Banse, SPD
 Heinrich Barlage, CDU
 Siegfried Bärsch, SPD
 Walter Bartram, CDU
 Hannsheinz Bauer, SPD
 Josef Bauer, CSU
 Friedrich Bauereisen, CSU
 Bernhard Bauknecht, CDU
 Valentin Baur, SPD
 Paul Bausch, CDU
 Helmut Bazille, SPD
 Fritz Becker, DP (from 14 March 1957 DP/FVP)
 Josef Becker, CDU
 Max Becker, FDP
 Arno Behrisch, SPD
 Reinhold F Bender, GB/BHE (from 12 July 1955 Non-attached, from 14 July 1955 Group Kraft/Oberländer, from 15 July 1955 Guest of CDU/CSU-Fraktion, from 20 March 1956 CDU/CSU)
 Franziska Bennemann, SPD
 Fritz Berendsen, CDU
 Hermann Berg, FDP (from 27 June 1955, from 23 February 1956 Non-attached, from 15 March 1956 Demokratische Arbeitsgemeinschaft (DA), from 26 June 1956 FVP, from 14 March 1957 DP/FVP)
 Karl Bergmann, SPD
 Bernhard Bergmeyer, CDU
 August Berlin, SPD
 Emil Bettgenhäuser, SPD
 Lucie Beyer, SPD
 Willi Birkelbach, SPD
 Otto Christian Archibald von Bismarck, CDU
 Peter Blachstein, SPD
 Martin Blank, FDP (from 23 February 1956 Non-attached, from 15 March 1956 Demokratische Arbeitsgemeinschaft (DA), from 26 June 1956 FVP, from 14 March 1957 DP/FVP)
 Theodor Blank, CDU
 Paul Bleiß, SPD
 Hildegard Bleyler, CDU
 Hans Blöcker, CDU (from 8 November 1954)
 Franz Blücher, FDP (from 23 February 1956 Non-attached, from 15 March 1956 Demokratische Arbeitsgemeinschaft (DA), from 26 June 1956 FVP, from 14 March 1957 DP/FVP)
 Paul Bock, CDU
 Ernst von Bodelschwingh, CDU
 Johannes Böhm, SPD (until 18 July 1957)
 Franz Böhm, CDU
 Franz Böhner, Zentrum (Non-attached, until 8 January 1954)
 Peter Wilhelm Brand, CDU
 Willy Brandt, SPD
 Aenne Brauksiepe, CDU
 Josef Brenner, CDU (from 5 May 1957)
 Heinrich von Brentano, CDU
 Wilhelm Brese, CDU
 Johannes Brockmann, Zentrum (Non-attached)
 Else Brökelschen, CDU
 Josef Brönner, CDU
 Walter Brookmann, CDU (until 31 August 1957)
 Valentin Brück, CDU (until 17 September 1957)
 Ernst-Christoph Brühler, DP (from 14 March 1957 DP/FVP)
 August Bruse, SPD
 Gerd Bucerius, CDU
 Ewald Bucher, FDP
 Karl von Buchka, CDU
 Alfred Burgemeister, CDU
 Dietrich Bürkel, CDU

C 

 Johannes Caspers, CDU
 Adolf Cillien, CDU
 Hermann Conring, CDU
 Fritz Corterier, SPD
 Herbert Czaja, CDU
 Fritz Czermak, GB/BHE (from 14 July 1955 FDP)

D 

 Otto Dannebom, SPD
 Robert Dannemann, FDP (until 1 July 1955)
 Robert Daum, SPD
 Thomas Dehler, FDP
 Heinrich Deist, SPD
 Hans Demmelmeier, CSU
 Georg Dewald, SPD
 Karl Diedrichsen, CDU
 Bruno Diekmann, SPD
 Anton Diel, SPD
 Maria Dietz, CDU
 Stefan Dittrich, CSU
 Clara Döhring, SPD
 Werner Dollinger, CSU
 Anton Donhauser, CSU
 Wilhelm Dopatka, SPD (from 21 November 1955)
 Walter Drechsel, FDP
 August Dresbach, CDU

E 

 Anton Eberhard, FDP
 Walter Eckhardt, GB/BHE (from 12 July 1955 Non-attached, from 14 July 1955 Group Kraft/Oberländer, from 15 July 1955 Guest of CDU/CSU-Fraktion, from 20 March 1956 CDU/CSU)
 Heinrich Eckstein, CDU
 Hermann Ehlers, CDU (until 29 October 1954)
 Hermann Ehren, CDU
 Rudolf Eickhoff, DP (from 14 March 1957 DP/FVP)
 Alexander Elbrächter, DP (from 14 March 1957 DP/FVP)
 Martin Elsner, GB/BHE
 Ernst Engelbrecht-Greve, CDU
 Hans Egon Engell, GB/BHE
 Ludwig Erhard, CDU
 Fritz Erler, SPD
 Fritz Eschmann, SPD
 Peter Etzenbach, CDU
 August-Martin Euler, FDP (from 23 February 1956 Non-attached, from 15 March 1956 Demokratische Arbeitsgemeinschaft (DA), from 26 June 1956 FVP, from 14 March 1957 DP/FVP)
 Johannes Even, CDU

F 

 Walter Faller, SPD
 Oskar Farny, CDU (until 11 November 1953)
 Heinrich Fassbender, FDP (from 18 November 1955 DP, from 14 March 1957 DP/FVP)
 Aloys Feldmann, CDU
 Erwin Feller, GB/BHE
 Eduard Fiedler, GB/BHE (until 13 October 1953)
 Eva Gräfin Finck von Finckenstein, GB/BHE (from 12 July 1955 Non-attached, from 14 July 1955 Group Kraft/Oberländer, from 15 July 1955 Guest of CDU/CSU-Fraktion, from 20 March 1956 CDU/CSU)
 Hermann Finckh, CDU
 Erni Finselberger, GB/BHE
 Egon Franke, SPD
 Ludwig Franz, CSU
 Jakob Franzen, CDU
 Heinz Frehsee, SPD
 Rudolf Freidhof, SPD
 Alfred Frenzel, SPD
 Ferdinand Friedensburg, CDU
 Hermann Friese, CDU
 Lotte Friese-Korn, FDP
 Konrad Frühwald, FDP
 Gustav Fuchs, CSU
 Friedrich Funk, CSU
 Hans Furler, CDU

G 

 Elisfrometh Ganswindt, CDU (from 9 November 1955)
 Mathilde Gantenberg, CDU (from 8 October 1956)
 Karl Gaul, FDP
 Gustav-Adolf Gedat, CDU
 Wilhelm Gefeller, SPD
 Hans Geiger, SPD (from 1 January 1954)
 Hugo Geiger, CSU
 Ingeborg Geisendörfer, CSU
 Heinz Gemein, GB/BHE
 Karl Gengler, CDU
 Robert Geritzmann, SPD
 Heinrich Gerns, CDU
 Eugen Gerstenmaier, CDU
 Paul Gibbert, CDU
 Christian Giencke, CDU
 Alfred Gille, GB/BHE
 Heinrich Glasmeyer, CDU
 Alfred Gleisner, SPD
 Franz Gleissner, CSU
 Hermann Glüsing, CDU
 Josef Gockeln, CDU
 Wilhelm Goldhagen, CDU
 Hubertus von Golitschek, FDP (from 18 April 1956)
 Wilhelm Gontrum, CDU
 Robert Görlinger, SPD (until 10 February 1954)
 Hermann Götz, CDU
 Carlo Graaff, FDP (from 4 July 1955)
 Benno Graf, CSU (from 26 October 1956 FVP, from 14 March 1957 DP/FVP)
 Fritz Grantze, CDU (from 17 November 1955)
 Otto Heinrich Greve, SPD
 Hans Griem, CDU (until 7 November 1955)
 Josef Grunner, SPD (from 11 June 1957, until 21 June 1957)
 Wilhelm Gülich, SPD
 Otto Gumrum, CSU (from 26 October 1956 FVP, from 14 March 1957 DP/FVP)
 Bernhard Günther, CDU

H 

 Horst Haasler, GB/BHE (from 12 July 1955 Non-attached, from 14 July 1955 Group Kraft/Oberländer, from 15 July 1955 Guest of CDU/CSU-Fraktion, from 20 March 1956 CDU/CSU)
 Karl Hahn, CDU
 Richard Hammer, FDP
 Werner Hansen, SPD
 Hermann Hansing, SPD
 Johann Harnischfeger, CDU
 Kai-Uwe von Hassel, CDU (until 4 November 1954)
 Herbert Hauffe, SPD
 Erwin Häussler, CDU
 Johann Karl Heide, SPD
 Rudolf-Ernst Heiland, SPD
 Fritz Heinrich, SPD
 Margarete Heise, SPD
 Martin Heix, Zentrum (from 23 September 1953 CDU/CSU)
 Fritz Held, FDP (from 13 September 1954)
 Josef Hellenbrock, SPD
 Heinrich Hellwege, DP (until 27 May 1955)
 Fritz Hellwig, CDU
 Georg Graf Henckel von Donnersmarck, CSU
 Hans Henn, FDP (from 23 February 1956 Non-attached, from 15 March 1956 Demokratische Arbeitsgemeinschaft (DA), from 26 June 1956 FVP, from 14 March 1957 DP/FVP)
 Karl Hepp, FDP (from 23 February 1956 Non-attached, from 15 March 1956 Demokratische Arbeitsgemeinschaft (DA), from 26 June 1956 FVP, from 14 March 1957 DP/FVP)
 Luise Herklotz, SPD (from 24 September 1956)
 Hans Hermsdorf, SPD
 Karl Herold, SPD
 Carl Hesberg, CDU
 Hellmuth Heye, CDU
 Anton Hilbert, CDU
 Hermann Höcherl, CSU
 Wilhelm Höck, CDU
 Heinrich Höcker, SPD
 Karl Hoffmann, FDP
 Heinrich Höfler, CDU
 Franz Höhne, SPD
 Ernst Holla, CDU
 Matthias Hoogen, CDU
 Fritz Wilhelm Hörauf, SPD
 Michael Horlacher, CSU
 Peter Horn, CDU
 Elinor Hubert, SPD
 Karl Hübner, FDP (from 23 February 1956 Non-attached, from 15 March 1956 Demokratische Arbeitsgemeinschaft (DA), from 26 June 1956 FVP, from 14 March 1957 DP/FVP)
 Josef Hufnagel, SPD
 Eugen Huth, CDU
 Margarete Hütter, FDP (from 29 September 1955)

I 

 Herta Ilk, FDP
 Joseph Illerhaus, CDU

J 

 Werner Jacobi, SPD
 Peter Jacobs, SPD
 Richard Jaeger, CSU
 Artur Jahn, CDU
 Hans Jahn, SPD
 Wenzel Jaksch, SPD
 Wilhelm Jentzsch, FDP
 Hedwig Jochmus, CDU
 Johann Peter Josten, CDU

K 

 Karl Kahn, CSU
 Georg Kahn-Ackermann, SPD
 Pia Kaiser, CDU (from 17 September 1956)
 Jakob Kaiser, CDU
 Hellmut Kalbitzer, SPD
 Margot Kalinke, DP (from 3 June 1955, from 14 March 1957 DP/FVP)
 Hugo Karpf, CSU
 Linus Kather, CDU (from 15 June 1954 GB/BHE)
 Irma Keilhack, SPD
 Wilfried Keller, GB/BHE
 Emil Kemmer, CSU
 Heinrich Kemper, CDU
 Alma Kettig, SPD
 Dietrich Keuning, SPD
 Kurt Georg Kiesinger, CDU
 Karl Alfred Kihn, CSU
 Georg Richard Kinat, SPD
 Liesel Kipp-Kaule, SPD
 Peterheinrich Kirchhoff, CDU
 Wolfgang Klausner, CSU
 Josef Ferdinand Kleindinst, CSU
 Georg Kliesing, CDU
 Gustav Klingelhöfer, SPD
 Otto Klötzer, GB/BHE
 Oskar Knapp, CDU
 Ludwig Knobloch, CDU
 Jakob Koenen, SPD
 Erich Köhler, CDU
 Walther Kolbe, CDU (until 25 December 1953)
 Willy Könen, SPD
 Wilhelm Königswarter, SPD
 Willi Koops, CDU
 Hermann Kopf, CDU
 Georg Körner, GB/BHE (from 12 July 1955 Non-attached, from 14 July 1955 FDP, from 23 February 1956 Non-attached, from 15 March 1956 Demokratische Arbeitsgemeinschaft (DA), from 26 June 1956 FVP, from 14 March 1957 DP/FVP)
 Lisa Korspeter, SPD
 Johannes Kortmann, CDU
 Waldemar Kraft, GB/BHE (from 12 July 1955 Non-attached, from 14 July 1955 Group Kraft/Oberländer, from 15 July 1955 Guest of CDU/CSU-Fraktion, from 20 March 1956 CDU/CSU)
 Angelo Kramel, CSU
 Karl Krammig, CDU
 Wilhelm Kratz, CDU (from 4 January 1957, until 11 April 1957)
 Gerhard Kreyssig, SPD
 Herbert Kriedemann, SPD
 Ludwig Kroll, CDU
 Heinrich Krone, CDU
 Edeltraud Kuchtner, CSU
 Walter Kühlthau, CDU
 Heinz Kühn, SPD
 Walther Kühn, FDP
 Ernst Kuntscher, CDU
 Lothar Kunz, GB/BHE
 Johannes Kunze, CDU
 Georg Kurlbaum, SPD
 Walter Kutschera, GB/BHE

L 

 Artur Ladebeck, SPD
 Karl Lahr, FDP (from 23 February 1956 Non-attached, from 15 March 1956 Demokratische Arbeitsgemeinschaft (DA), from 26 June 1956 FVP, from 14 March 1957 DP/FVP)
 Georg Lang, CSU
 Erwin Lange, SPD
 Eugen Leibfried, CDU (until 21 June 1956)
 Christian Leibing, CDU (from 8 August 1955)
 Walter Leiske, CDU
 Erich Leitow, SPD (from 3 August 1956)
 Ernst Lemmer, CDU
 Otto Lenz, CDU (until 2 May 1957)
 Aloys Lenz, CDU
 Hans Lenz, FDP
 Franz Lenze, CDU
 Gottfried Leonhard, CDU
 Josef Lermer, CSU
 Edmund Leukert, CSU
 Paul Leverkuehn, CDU
 Heinrich Lindenberg, CDU
 Hermann Lindrath, CDU
 Gertrud Lockmann, SPD
 Walter Löhr, CDU
 Wilhelm Lotze, CDU (from 1 November 1954)
 Hubertus Prinz zu Löwenstein-Wertheim-Freudenberg, FDP (from 6 June 1957 Non-attached, from 25 June 1957 DP/FVP)
 Heinrich Lübke, CDU
 Paul Luchtenberg, FDP (from 18 September 1954, until 9 April 1956)
 Paul Lücke, CDU
 Hans August Lücker, CSU
 Marie-Elisfrometh Lüders, FDP
 Adolf Ludwig, SPD
 Wilhelm Adam Lulay, CDU
 Gerhard Lütkens, SPD (until 17 November 1955)

M 

 Ernst Majonica, CDU
 Hasso von Manteuffel, FDP (from 23 February 1956 Non-attached, from 15 March 1956 Demokratische Arbeitsgemeinschaft (DA), from 26 June 1956 FVP, from 14 March 1957 DP/FVP)
 Georg Baron Manteuffel-Szoege, CSU
 Robert Margulies, FDP
 Franz Marx, SPD
 Willy Massoth, CDU
 Heinz Matthes, DP (from 14 March 1957 DP/FVP)
 Kurt Mattick, SPD
 Oskar Matzner, SPD
 Eugen Maucher, CDU (until 16 September 1956)
 Adolf Mauk, FDP
 Agnes Katharina Maxsein, CDU
 Josef Mayer, CDU (from 20 November 1953)
 Reinhold Mayer, FDP (until 14 May 1956)
 Friedrich Mayer, SPD
 Hugo Mayer, CDU
 Karl Meitmann, SPD
 Wilhelm Mellies, SPD
 Erich Mende, FDP
 Josef Menke, CDU
 Fritz Mensing, CDU
 Walter Menzel, SPD
 Hans-Joachim von Merkatz, DP (from 14 March 1957 DP/FVP)
 Hans Merten, SPD
 Ludwig Metzger, SPD
 Erich Meyer, SPD
 Philipp Meyer, CSU
 Trudel Meyer, SPD
 Emmy Meyer-Laule, SPD
 Rudolf Meyer-Ronnenberg, GB/BHE (from 20 August 1954 CDU/CSU)
 Friedrich Middelhauve, FDP (until 10 September 1954)
 Herwart Miessner, FDP
 Anton Miller, CSU
 Friedhelm Missmahl, SPD (from 1 September 1954)
 Karl Mocker, GB/BHE
 Siegfried Moerchel, CDU
 Matthias Moll, SPD
 Karl Mommer, SPD
 Wendelin Morgenthaler, CDU
 Richard Muckermann, CDU
 Franz Mühlenberg, CDU
 Gebhard Müller, CDU (until 11 November 1953)
 Karl Müller, DP (from 14 March 1957 DP/FVP)
 Hans Müller, SPD
 Karl Müller, CDU
 Willy Müller, SPD
 Ernst Müller-Hermann, CDU
 Franzjosef Müser, CDU

N 

 Frieda Nadig, SPD
 Wilhelm Naegel, CDU (until 24 May 1956)
 Peter Nellen, CDU
 Kurt Neubauer, SPD
 August Neuburger, CDU
 Franz Neumann, SPD
 Fritz Neumayer, FDP (from 23 February 1956 Non-attached, from 15 March 1956 Demokratische Arbeitsgemeinschaft (DA), from 26 June 1956 FVP, from 14 March 1957 DP/FVP)
 Alois Niederalt, CSU
 Maria Niggemeyer, CDU

O 

 Theodor Oberländer, GB/BHE (from 12 July 1955 Non-attached, from 14 July 1955 Group Kraft/Oberländer, from 15 July 1955 Guest of CDU/CSU-Fraktion, from 20 March 1956 CDU/CSU)
 Willy Odenthal, SPD
 Josef Oesterle, CSU
 Richard Oetzel, CDU
 Fritz Ohlig, SPD
 Erich Ollenhauer, SPD
 Alfred Onnen, FDP
 Franz Op den Orth, SPD
 Eduard Orth, CDU (until 7 October 1956)

P 

 Ernst Paul, SPD
 Georg Pelster, CDU
 Luise Peter, SPD (from 24 July 1957)
 Georg Peters, SPD
 Helmut Petersen, GB/BHE
 Robert Pferdmenges, CDU
 Karl Georg Pfleiderer, FDP (until 20 September 1955)
 Elisfrometh Pitz-Savelsberg, CDU
 Eduard Platner, CDU (from 12 December 1956 DP, from 14 March 1957 DP/FVP)
 Kurt Pohle, SPD
 Wolfgang Pohle, CDU
 Heinz Pöhler, SPD
 Gisela Praetorius, CDU
 Ludwig Preiß, FDP (from 23 February 1956 Non-attached, from 15 March 1956 Demokratische Arbeitsgemeinschaft (DA), from 26 June 1956 FVP, from 14 March 1957 DP/FVP)
 Ludwig Preller, SPD
 Carl Prennel, SPD (from 9 November 1955)
 Victor-Emanuel Preusker, FDP (from 23 February 1956 Non-attached, from 15 March 1956 Demokratische Arbeitsgemeinschaft (DA), from 26 June 1956 FVP, from 14 March 1957 DP/FVP)
 Moritz-Ernst Priebe, SPD
 Maria Probst, CSU
 Hermann Pünder, CDU
 Werner Pusch, SPD
 Paul Putzig, SPD (from 13 February 1954)

R 

 Willy Max Rademacher, FDP
 Bernhard Raestrup, CDU
 Hugo Rasch, SPD
 Will Rasner, CDU
 Ludwig Ratzel, SPD (from 15 September 1955)
 Karl Regling, SPD
 Luise Rehling, CDU
 Reinhold Rehs, SPD
 Willy Reichstein, GB/BHE
 Hans Reif, FDP
 Wilhelm Reitz, SPD
 Richard Reitzner, SPD
 Annemarie Renger, SPD
 Hans Richarts, CDU
 Willi Richter, SPD
 Max Freiherr Riederer von Paar, CSU
 Walter Rinke, CSU
 Heinrich Georg Ritzel, SPD
 Franz Josef Röder, CDU (from 4 January 1957)
 Julie Rösch, CDU
 Josef Rösing, Zentrum (from 14 January 1954, Non-attached, from 25 June 1954 Guest of CDU/CSU-Fraktion, from 6 June 1955 CDU/CSU)
 Margarete Rudoll, SPD
 Thomas Ruf, CDU
 Heinrich-Wilhelm Ruhnke, SPD
 Franz Ruland, CVP (from 4 January 1957, from 23 May 1957 Guest of CDU/CSU-Fraktion)
 Oskar Rümmele, CDU
 Hermann Runge, SPD

S 
 Anton Sabel, CDU
 Adolf Franz Samwer, GB/BHE (from 15 October 1953, from 12 July 1955 Non-attached, from 14 July 1955 Group Kraft/Oberländer, from 15 July 1955 Guest of CDU/CSU-Fraktion, from 20 March 1956 CDU/CSU)
 Walter Sassnick, SPD (until 6 November 1955)
 Manfred Schäfer, CDU (from 4 January 1957)
 Hermann Schäfer, FDP (from 23 February 1956 Non-attached, from 15 March 1956 Demokratische Arbeitsgemeinschaft (DA), from 26 June 1956 FVP, from 14 March 1957 DP/FVP)
 Fritz Schäffer, CSU
 Marta Schanzenbach, SPD
 Hugo Scharnberg, CDU
 Walter Scheel, FDP
 Ernst Schellenberg, SPD
 Heinrich Scheppmann, CDU
 Josef Scheuren, SPD
 Heinrich Schild, DP (from 14 March 1957 DP/FVP)
 Lambert Schill, CDU
 Josef Schlick, CDU
 Hanns Schloß, FDP
 Carlo Schmid, SPD
 Helmut Schmidt, SPD
 Martin Schmidt, SPD
 Karlfranz Schmidt-Wittmack, CDU (from 22 April 1954 Non-attached, Loss of mandate 23 February 1956)
 Hermann Schmitt, SPD
 Kurt Schmücker, CDU
 Heinrich Schneider, DPS (from 4 January 1957, Guest of FDP-Fraktion)
 Franz Schneider, CVP (from 4 January 1957, Non-attached, from 23 May 1957 Guest of CDU/CSU-Fraktion)
 Ludwig Schneider, FDP (from 23 February 1956 Non-attached, from 15 March 1956 Demokratische Arbeitsgemeinschaft (DA), from 26 June 1956 FVP, from 14 March 1957 DP/FVP)
 Herbert Schneider, DP (from 14 March 1957 DP/FVP)
 Georg Schneider, CDU
 Erwin Schoettle, SPD
 Joachim Schöne, SPD
 Rudolf Schrader, CDU
 Helmuth Schranz, DP (from 14 March 1957 DP/FVP)
 Nikolaus Schreiner, SPD (from 4 January 1957)
 Gerhard Schröder, CDU
 Louise Schroeder, SPD (until 4 June 1957)
 Richard Schröter, SPD
 Hans Schuberth, CSU
 Fritz Schuler, CDU (until 30 July 1955)
 Hubert Schulze-Pellengahr, CDU
 Josef Schüttler, CDU
 Hans Schütz, CSU
 Hermann Schwann, FDP
 Werner Schwarz, CDU
 Elisfrometh Schwarzhaupt, CDU
 Erich Schwertner, DPS (from 4 January 1957, from 8 January 1957 Guest of FDP-Fraktion)
 Hans-Christoph Seebohm, DP (from 14 March 1957 DP/FVP)
 Roland Seffrin, CDU
 Frank Seiboth, GB/BHE
 Max Seidel, SPD
 Franz Seidl, CSU
 Max Seither, SPD
 Günther Serres, CDU
 Walter Seuffert, SPD
 Wilmar Sfromaß, CDU
 Anton Sfromel, CDU (until 16 September 1957)
 Theodor Siebel, CDU
 J Hermann Siemer, CDU
 Emil Solke, CDU
 Paul Sornik, GB/BHE
 August Spies, CDU
 Josef Spies, CSU
 Max Spörl, CSU
 Karl Graf von Spreti, CSU (until 5 March 1956)
 Ernst Srock, GB/BHE
 Willy Stahl, FDP
 Wolfgang Stammberger, FDP
 Heinz Starke, FDP
 Robert Stauch, CDU
 Artur Stegner, FDP (from 13 January 1954 Non-attached, from 6 February 1957 GB/BHE)
 Viktoria Steinbiß, CDU
 Karl Steinhauer, CDU (from 12 April 1957)
 Georg Stierle, SPD
 Georg Stiller, CSU
 Josef Stingl, CDU
 Anton Storch, CDU
 Leo Storm, CDU
 Heinrich Sträter, SPD
 Franz Josef Strauß, CSU
 Käte Strobel, SPD
 Johannes-Helmut Strosche, GB/BHE
 Detlef Struve, CDU
 Richard Stücklen, CSU
 Ferdinand Stümer, SPD (from 30 March 1954)

T 

 Franz Tausch-Treml, SPD (from 25 June 1957)
 Wilhelm Tenhagen, SPD (until 22 August 1954)
 Theodor Teriete, CDU
 Willy Thieme, SPD
 Johann Thies, CDU (from 30 May 1956)
 Robert Tillmanns, CDU (until 12 November 1955)
 Wilhelm Traub, SPD (until 8 September 1955)
 Hermann Trittelvitz, SPD (until 12 September 1956)

U 

 Franz Xaver Unertl, CSU

V 

 Franz Varelmann, CDU
 Hermann Veit, SPD (until 10 December 1953)
 Elisfrometh Vietje, CDU
 Rudolf Vogel, CDU
 Heinrich Voß, CDU

W 

 Gerhard Wacher, CSU
 Oskar Wacker, CDU
 Friedrich Wilhelm Wagner, SPD
 Josef Wagner, SPD
 Eduard Wahl, CDU
 Albert Walter, DP (from 14 March 1957 DP/FVP)
 Karl Walz, CDU
 Fritz Weber, FDP (from 15 May 1956)
 Helene Weber, CDU
 Karl Weber, CDU
 Fritz Wedel, DPS (from 4 January 1957, Non-attached, from 8 January 1957 Guest of FDP-Fraktion)
 Heinrich Wehking, CDU
 Herbert Wehner, SPD
 Philipp Wehr, SPD
 Erwin Welke, SPD
 Hans Wellhausen, FDP (from 23 February 1956 Non-attached, from 15 March 1956 Demokratische Arbeitsgemeinschaft (DA), from 23 June 1956 CDU/CSU)
 Friedrich Welskop, CDU
 Emmi Welter, CDU (from 4 January 1954)
 Ernst Weltner, SPD
 Fritz Wenzel, SPD
 Friedrich Werber, CDU
 Willi Weyer, FDP (until 17 September 1954)
 Hugo Wiedeck, CDU
 Karl Wienand, SPD
 Karl Wieninger, CSU
 Hans-Peter Will, SPD (from 4 January 1957)
 Rudolf Will, FDP
 Friedrich Wilhelm Willeke, CDU
 Heinrich Windelen, CDU (from 28 September 1957)
 Bernhard Winkelheide, CDU
 Ernst Winter, SPD (until 7 March 1954)
 Friedrich Winter, CSU (from 6 March 1956)
 Carl Wirths, FDP (until 16 June 1955)
 Otto Wittenburg, DP (from 14 March 1957 DP/FVP)
 Franz Wittmann, CSU
 Karl Wittrock, SPD
 Albert Wolf, CDU (from 13 November 1953)
 Jeanette Wolff, SPD
 Franz-Josef Wuermeling, CDU
 Heinrich Wullenhaupt, CDU

Z 

 Otto Ziegler, SPD (until 27 July 1956)
 Heinrich Zimmermann, DP (from 14 March 1957 DP/FVP)
 Ernst Zühlke, SPD

See also 

 Politics of Germany
 List of Bundestag Members

02